Fluorine nitrate is an unstable derivative of nitric acid with the formula . It is shock-sensitive. Due to its instability, it is often produced from chlorine nitrate as needed.

Synthesis and properties
Fluorine nitrate is formed when fluorine gas is bubbled through nitric acid or reacted with solid potassium nitrate:

It decomposes in water to form oxygen gas, oxygen difluoride, hydrofluoric acid, and nitric acid.

References 

Nitrates
Fluorides